The AVS Shadow, also known as the Shadow Mk.I, is a purpose-built sports prototype race car, designed, developed and built by Shadow Racing Cars to Group 7 racing specifications, specifically to compete in the Can-Am racing series, in 1970. It was Shadow's first Can-Am car.

References

Sports prototypes
Can-Am cars
AVS